Numerous museums of the inner German border are located along the course of the former border between East and West Germany, documenting its story and in some places preserving original elements of the border fortifications.

References

Inner German border
Inner
History museums in Germany